ROKS Sejong the Great (DDG-991) is the lead ship of the her class of guided missile destroyer built for the Republic of Korea Navy. She was the first Aegis-built destroyer of the service and was named after the fourth king of the Joseon dynasty of Korea, Sejong the Great.

Background 
The ship features the Aegis Combat System (Baseline 7 Phase 1) combined with AN/SPY-1D multi-function radar antennae.

The Sejong the Great class is the third phase of the South Korean navy's Korean Destroyer eXperimental (KDX) program, a substantial shipbuilding program, which is geared toward enhancing ROKN's ability to successfully defend the maritime areas around South Korea from various modes of threats as well as becoming a blue-water navy.

At 8,500 tons standard displacement and 11,000 tons full load, the KDX-III Sejong the Great destroyers are by far the largest destroyers in the South Korean Navy, and indeed are larger than most destroyers in the navies of other countries. and built slightly bulkier and heavier than s or s to accommodate 32 more missiles. As such, some analysts believe that this class of ships is more appropriately termed a class of cruisers rather than destroyers. KDX-III are currently the largest ships to carry the Aegis combat system.

Construction and career 
ROKS Sejong the Great was launched on 25 May 2007 by Hyundai Heavy Industries. She was commissioned into the ROK Navy on 22 December 2008.

RIMPAC Exercise 

Republic of Korea Navy (ROKN) has actively participated in the recent iterations of the RIMPAC, which is a unique training opportunity that helps participants foster and sustain cooperative relationships. On 23 June 2010, ROKS Sejong the Great participated in RIMPAC 2010.

She again participated in 2016 RIMPAC exercises along with ROKS Kang Gam-chan, and submarine ROKS Lee Eokgi of the ROKN.

Sejong the Great again participated in RIMPAC 2022.

Gallery

References 

Sejong the Great-class destroyers
Ships built by Hyundai Heavy Industries Group
2007 ships